The Sequoyah Book Award is a set of three annual awards for books selected by vote of Oklahoma students in elementary, middle, and high schools. The award program is named after Sequoyah (–1843), the Cherokee man who developed the Cherokee syllabary—a writing system adopted by Cherokee Nation in 1825. The awards are sponsored by the Oklahoma Library Association and administered by a committee of OLA members.  Every year, three teams representing each award read and select books to be included on the master lists, which are then provided to Oklahoma schools for students to read and vote on. The winners are announced early spring of each year, and the winning authors are invited to the Association's annual conference to receive their awards and meet with students. The  Sequoyah Children's Book Award, now voted by children in grades 3 to 5, was inaugurated in 1959. It is the third oldest U.S. state children's choice award after the original Kansas award and Vermont award. The Sequoyah Intermediate Book Award is voted by grades 6 to 8. It dates from 1988 where it was originally named the Young Adult award. Finally in 2010, the Sequoyah High School Book Award (grades 9–12) was added to the program. The Sequoyah Committee also selects the Donna Norvell Award; The Donna Norvell Book Award was established in 2005 by the Oklahoma Library Association and is given annually, with the first award given in 2006. The Donna Norvell Book Award honors a book that has made a significant contribution to the field of literature for children through second grade.

Until 2020, this award was a librarian's choice award and selected by librarians who were members of the Oklahoma Library Association's Sequoyah Book Award Committee. It is now a children's choice award for students in grades 2 and under, with the Children's Sequoyah Committee selecting the award nominees.

The award is named for Donna Norvell, Children's Consultant for the Oklahoma Department of Libraries from 1992 to 2004, who died in 2004. The award honors Donna's contributions to the development of the library profession in Oklahoma.

Children's winners

Young Adult and Intermediate winners

High School winners

Donna Norvell Award winners

The Norvell Award "honors a book making a significant contribution to the field of literature for children through third grade ... written and illustrated to present, organize, and interpret material for children." The writer and illustrator must be US residents, the book published two years before the award year (2012 publications in 2014). Librarians on the Sequoyah Committee select the winner.

 The official award webpage identifies only the title and writer.

References

External links
 "Children's Sequoyah Winners". OLA.
 "YA Sequoyah Winners (1988–2009)". OLA.
 "Intermediate Sequoyah Winners (2010–)". OLA.
 "High School Sequoyah Winners (2010–)". OLA.
 Official website

American children's literary awards
Awards established in 1959
1959 establishments in Oklahoma
Oklahoma education-related lists
Oklahoma culture